Cliff Hall or Clifford Hall may refer to:

, American photographer and designer
, Cuban-born Jamaican musician, member of the English folk music group The Spinners.
, American comedian
, English pianist
 (1902–1982), English cricketer
 (1904–1973), British painter